Joseph Withers Power (March 2, 1867 - April 5, 1926) was a Mississippi politician and the Secretary of State of Mississippi from 1901 to 1926.

Early life 
Joseph Withers Power was born on March 2, 1867, in Jackson, Mississippi. He was the son of Irish emigrant John Logan Power, who became the Mississippi Secretary of State from 1893 to 1901, and his wife, Elizabeth (Wilkinson) Power. J. W. Power attended public schools in Jackson. Then, he attended Southwestern Presbyterian University in Clarksville, Tennessee. After leaving school, he assisted his father in the publishing business and became a bookkeeper.

Political career 
When Joseph's father, John Logan Power, was the Secretary of State of Mississippi, he was an assistant in the office of the Secretary of State of Mississippi. After his father's death on September 23, 1901, Mississippi governor A. H. Longino appointed him Secretary of State of Mississippi. He was re-elected in 1903, 1907, and 1911. In 1923, he defeated Walker Wood in the primary election for the Democratic nomination to the office.

Death 
While still the Secretary of State of Mississippi, Power died suddenly in Jackson on April 5, 1926. Walker Wood was appointed to the office finish the unfinished term.

Personal life 
Power was a Democrat, member of the Episcopal Church, Freemason, Odd Fellow, and a Knight of Pythias. Power married Eva Truly in 1896. They had three children, Dorothy, Mary, and Josephine Jeffrey "Jo Jeff".

References 

1867 births
1926 deaths
People from Jackson, Mississippi
Mississippi Democrats
Secretaries of State of Mississippi